Kenneth L. Howard House, also known as the Women's Club of Dunn, is a historic home located near Dunn, Harnett County, North Carolina.  It was built in 1908–1909, and is a -story, three bay, Colonial Revival style frame mansion.  It has a high hipped roof crowned by a mock widow's walk and features a two-story free Ionic order portico and one-story wraparound porch.  The house is a copy of the North Carolina Building at the Jamestown Exposition of 1907.  In 1953 it was acquired as the headquarters of the Woman's Club.

It was listed on the National Register of Historic Places in 1982.

References

Houses on the National Register of Historic Places in North Carolina
Colonial Revival architecture in North Carolina
Houses completed in 1909
Houses in Harnett County, North Carolina
National Register of Historic Places in Harnett County, North Carolina